De Broqueville government in Sainte-Adresse refers to two successive Belgian governments, led by Charles de Broqueville, which served as governments in exile during the German occupation of Belgium in World War I. They were based in Le Havre in northern France after October 1914. The first government, known as the First de Broqueville government, was a Catholic government which elected in 1911 and continued until 1916, when it was joined by Socialists and Liberals expanding it into the Second de Broqueville government which would last until 1 June 1918. In November 1914, the vast majority of Belgian territory (2,598 out of 2,636 communes) was under German occupation. The only portion of Belgium that remained controlled by the Kingdom of Belgium in exile was the strip of territory behind the Yser Front.

Exile in Le Havre

In October 1914, the government moved to the French coastal city of Le Havre. It was established in the large Immeuble Dufayel ("Dufayel Building"), built by the French businessman Georges Dufayel in 1911, situated in the suburb of Sainte-Adresse. The whole area of Sainte-Adresse, which still carries the national colours of Belgium on its shield, was leased to Belgium by the French government as a temporary administrative centre while the rest of Belgium was occupied. The area had a sizeable Belgian émigré population, and even used Belgian postage stamps.

King Albert I considered that it was inappropriate for the King to leave his own country and so did not join his government in Le Havre. Instead, he established his staff in the Flemish town of Veurne, just behind the Yser Front, in the last strip of unoccupied Belgian territory.

Composition
The de Broqueville government comprised:
Baron Charles de Broqueville (Catholic) as Prime Minister (known as chef du cabinet until November 1918).
Henry Carton de Wiart (Catholic), Minister of Justice
Julien Davignon (Catholic), Minister of Foreign Affairs until 18 January 1916
Paul Berryer (Catholic), Minister of the Interior
Prosper Poullet (Catholic), Minister of Arts and Sciences, as well as Minister for Economic Affairs after 1 January 1918
Aloys Van de Vyvere (Catholic), Minister of Finance
Georges Helleputte (Catholic), Minister of Agriculture and Public Works
Armand Hubert (Catholic), Minister of Industry and Work
Paul Segers (Catholic), Minister of Railways, the Marine, and the PTT
Armand De Ceuninck (technocrat), Minister of War after 4 August 1917
Jules Renkin (Catholic), Minister of the Colonies
Baron Eugène Beyens (technocrat), member of the Council of Ministers after 30 July 1916; Minister of Foreign Affairs between 18 January 1916 to 4 August 1917
Paul Hymans (Liberal), member of the Council of Ministers after 18 January 1916; Minister of Economic Affairs from 12 November 1917 to 1 January 1918; Minister of Foreign Affairs after 1 January 1918.
Count Eugène Goblet d'Alviella (Liberal), member of the Council of Ministers after 18 January 1916
Emile Vandervelde (Socialist), member of the Council of Ministers after 18 January 1916; Minister of Supplies after 4 August 1917
Emile Brunet (Socialist), member of the Council of Ministers after 1 January 1918.

Criticism
The Flamingant poet René de Clercq published a poem called Aan Die Van Havere ("To those of Le Havre") in 1916, in which he accused the government (the "Lords of Le Havre") of having forgotten the plight of Flanders.

References

Further reading

See also 
 Declaration of Sainte-Adresse

Belgian governments
Belgium in World War I
1911 establishments in Belgium
1914 establishments in France
1918 disestablishments in Belgium
1918 disestablishments in France
Le Havre
Former governments in exile